The 2019–20 season was Trabzonspor's 52nd year in existence. In addition to the domestic league, the club participated in the Turkish Cup and the UEFA Europa League.

On 29 July 2020, Trabzonspor defeated Alanyaspor 2–0 to win their ninth Turkish Cup and end a ten-year trophy drought.

Squad

Intaken youth players

Out on loan

Left during the season

Competitions

Süper Lig

League table

Results summary

Results by matchday

Matches

Turkish Cup

Europa League

Third qualifying round

Trabzonspor won 4–3 on aggregate.

Play-off round

3–3 on aggregate. Trabzonspor won on away goals.

Group stage

Statistics

Goalscorers

Clean sheets

References

External links

Trabzonspor seasons
Trabzonspor
Trabzonspor